Arkansas Highway 192 (AR 192, Hwy. 192) is a designation for two state highways in Garland County, Arkansas. One route of  runs from US Route 70 (US 70) to Lakeshore Drive near Lake Hamilton. A second routing begins east of Lake Ouachita State Park at Highway 227 and runs northeast to Highway 7 near Hot Springs Village.

Route description

US 70 to Lake Hamilton
Highway 192 begins at US 70 southwest of Hot Springs and winds generally south along the shoreline to terminate at Northshore Drive. Traffic counts from the Arkansas State Highway and Transportation Department (AHTD) reveal that less than 500 vehicles per day (VPD) used Highway 192 along its routing from US 70 to Northshore Drive.

Lake Ouachita State Park to Hot Springs Village
The highway begins near Lake Ouachita State Park at Highway 227. The route runs almost directly northeast through very rural and heavily forested areas of Garland County. Highway 192 terminates at its only junction with a state highway, Highway 7 at the outskirts of Hot Springs Village. This segment was added to the state highway system in 2004 and averages approximately 1800 vehicles per day along the entire routing.

Major intersections

|-
| align=center colspan=4 | Highway 192 begins at Highway 227
|-

Notes

References

192
Transportation in Garland County, Arkansas